The Vulcanair V1.0 is an Italian light aircraft, designed and produced by Vulcanair of Casoria, introduced at the AERO Friedrichshafen show in 2014. The aircraft is type certified by the European Aviation Safety Agency and the US Federal Aviation Administration and is supplied complete and ready-to-fly.

The design is a derivation of the Partenavia P.64B Oscar.

Design and development
The V1.0 features a strut-braced rectangular planform high-wing, a four-seat enclosed cabin accessed by two front doors and one rear seat door on the right side, fixed tricycle landing gear with wheel pants and a single engine in tractor configuration.

The aircraft forward fuselage is made from welded steel tubing, with the balance of the airframe of sheet aluminum construction. Its  span wing employs flaps. The standard engine used is the  Lycoming IO-360-M1A four-stroke fuel-injected powerplant.

The design greatly resembles the Cessna 172 and is intended to compete with that aircraft in performance and price. In July 2017, the company announced an equipped price  with a Garmin G500 avionics suite of US$259,000, to undercut the price of a new Cessna 172.

European Aviation Safety Agency certification was completed in November 2013 and the US Federal Aviation Administration certification in December 2017.

Operators

Orders
Delaware State University - 10 ordered in November 2018

Specifications (V1.0)

References

External links

V1.0
2010s Italian civil utility aircraft
Single-engined tractor aircraft
High-wing aircraft